The , abbreviated , is a national expressway in Japan. It is owned and operated by East Nippon Expressway Company. It is signed E6 under the Ministry of Land, Infrastructure, Transport and Tourism's "2016 Proposal for Realization of Expressway Numbering."

Route description

The expressway is an important route connecting the greater Tokyo area with Mito, the capital of Ibaraki Prefecture. Beyond Mito, the expressway follows a northerly route along the coast of the Pacific Ocean to the city of Iwaki in Fukushima Prefecture. Continuing north along the coast, the expressway enters the greater Sendai area. The expressway supplements the Tōhoku Expressway as an access route between Tokyo and the Tōhoku region.

For most of its length the expressway parallels National Route 6 and the Jōban Line of East Japan Railway Company.

The expressway gets within about six kilometers from the damaged Fukushima Daiichi Nuclear Power Plant.

Naming
Jōban is a kanji acronym consisting of two characters. Each character represents a former province of Japan that is passed through by the route:  representing present-day Ibaraki Prefecture and  representing the eastern portion of present-day Fukushima Prefecture

The expressway carries the Jōban Expressway name from the origin at Misato Junction to Watari Interchange. From Watari Interchange to the expected terminus at Tomiya-kita Interchange, the Jōban Expressway name is currently an official designation only. The section from Watari Interchange to Sendaikō-kita Interchange is the Sendai-Tōbu Road, the section from Sendaikō-kita Interchange to Rifu Junction is the Sanriku Expressway (Senen Road), and the section from Rifu Junction to the terminus is the Sendai-Hokubu Road. It is unknown if the naming of these sections will be changed upon completion of the Jōban Expressway.

The expressway has a speed limit of 70 km/h between Iwaki-chūō Interchange and its northern terminus at Watari, a limit of 80 km/h between its southern terminus and Kashiwa Interchange and between Hitachiminami-Ōta and Iwaki-chūō interchanges, and a speed limit of 100 km/h on the remainder of the expressway.

History
The first section of the expressway was opened in 1981. The section from Jōban-Tomioka Interchange to Watari Interchange is under construction, and extensions and upgrades to the existing Sendai road network are also planned.

Incidents and closures
During the 13 February 2021 Fukushima earthquake, landslides buried parts of the expressway, and embankments along it collapsed; however, no vehicles were trapped inside the debris. A  section of the expressway at another location was uplifted. The damages facilitated the closure of the expressway between Shinchi and Sōma interchanges in Fukushima Prefecture. In response, the East Nippon Expressway Company deployed heavy equipment to remove boulders and clear up debris along the expressway. By 17 February, the blockages along the expressway were cleared allowing traffic to resume along the route. Fences were also erected along the stricken sections of the expressway to prevent further rockslides.

List of junctions and features
 PA - parking area, SA - service area, TB - toll gate

References

External links

 East Nippon Expressway Company

Expressways in Japan
Roads in Chiba Prefecture
Roads in Fukushima Prefecture
Roads in Ibaraki Prefecture
Roads in Miyagi Prefecture
Roads in Saitama Prefecture
1981 establishments in Japan